The Achzarit ( in Hebrew: "cruel", female inflection) is a heavily armored personnel carrier manufactured by the Israeli Defence Forces Corps of Ordnance.

History
The Achzarit is based on the Soviet-built T-54/T-55 tank, beginning with those captured from Arab armies during the Arab–Israeli wars. To make space for a troop compartment, the eight-and-a-half tonnes turret, the original superstructure of the chassis and the transversely mounted engine were removed. 
Non-Explosive Reactive Armour was installed over the original hull. The first model of the Achzarit entered in service in 1988.

Design

Protection
The Achzarit can withstand both shaped-charges and armor-piercing projectiles which would destroy conventional IFVs. The manufacturers claim that the machine can withstand repeated 125 mm APFSDS hits over its frontal arc. At 44 tonnes, the machine is exceptionally heavy for an infantry carrier. The fact that 14 tonnes of the vehicle's weight is made up of additional advanced special composite armor, gives some indication as to its high degree of protection.

Weapons
It is armed with three 7.62 mm machine guns, including one Rafael Overhead Weapons Station, a machine gun controlled from within the cabin, developed by Rafael Advanced Defense Systems. As a lesson from the Second Intifada, a bulletproof glass turret was installed over one of the hatches to enable the commander to see outside without being exposed to small arms fire and shrapnel.

Several Achzarit in service have been upgraded with a 12.7 mm Samson Remote Controlled Weapon Station in place of the standard 7.62 mm Rafael Overhead Weapon Station.

Operations
Because of its heavy armor, the Achzarit is sometimes called a Heavy APC (HAPC).

Achzarit APCs took part in Operation Rainbow in Rafah, after a comparatively lightly armored M113 APC was destroyed by an RPG. Achzarit APCs were also involved in the Gaza War.

Gallery

See also
 VIU-55 Munja, similar example from Serbia
 BTR-T, similar example from Russia
 BMPT Terminator, a Russian tank-derived AFV designed to fight infantry rather than transport it
 BMPV-64 :ru:БМПВ-64/:uk:БМПВ-64: A Ukrainian heavy infantry combat vehicle based on the T-64 chassis
 Kangaroo (armoured personnel carrier), a series of Allied World War 2 armoured personnel carriers that were based on converted tanks.

References

External links

 Achzarit Family + Tiran family
 Achzarit at Israeli-Weapons.com

Armoured personnel carriers of Israel
Tracked armoured personnel carriers
Military vehicles introduced in the 1980s